Wheeler Block may refer to:

Wheeler Block (Denver, Colorado), a Denver Landmark
Wheeler Block (Colchester, Connecticut), listed on the National Register of Historic Places in New London County
Wheeler Block (Toledo, Ohio), formerly listed on the National Register of Historic Places in Lucas County, Ohio